KBEX may refer to:

 KBEX (FM), a defunct radio station (96.1 FM) licensed to serve Dalhart Texas, held the KBEX calls from 2013 until it went silent in 2021.
 KBEX-LP, a defunct low-power television station (channel 6) formerly licensed to serve Amarillo, Texas; see List of radio stations in Texas
 KUBJ, a radio station (89.7 FM) licensed to serve Brenham Texas, held the KBEX calls from 2005-2008
 A long list of television and radio stations appear in fictional works with KBEX as a placeholder. The callsign had not been assigned to any real station before 2005 and was presumed to be safe for use in cinema and television storywriting in that era.